Steven C. Quay is an American author, scientist, and businessman. He is the current chief executive officer (CEO) of Atossa Therapeutics.

Biography 
Quay received his education from the University of Michigan Medical School and completed his doctorate in 1975. Quay worked as a postdoctoral fellow with Nobel Laureate Har Gobind Khorana at MIT. He has previously worked as a faculty member of Department of Pathology, Stanford University School of Medicine.

In 2009, Quay founded Atossa Therapeutics, a biopharmaceutical company based in Seattle. The company is listed on Nasdaq since 2012.

In September 2021, Quay published a book, The Origin of the Virus: The hidden truths behind the microbe that killed millions of people, along with Angus Dalgleish and Paolo Barnard. He is also an author of a book named Stay Safe: A Physician's Guide to Survive Coronavirus.

Bibliography

Books

Publications

References 

Living people
21st-century American non-fiction writers
University of Michigan Medical School alumni
Stanford University School of Medicine faculty
Year of birth missing (living people)